Cauchas is a genus of the fairy longhorn moth family (Adelidae). Among these, it belongs to subfamily Adelinae.
The taxon "Cauchas" Philipp Christoph Zeller 1839 was originally created as a subgenus of the genus Adela Latreille 1796 but was raised to the genus level in 1980 by Ebbe Schmidt Nielsen .

Species
 Cauchas albiantennella (Burmann, 1943)
 Cauchas anatolica (Rebel, 1902)
 Cauchas breviantennella Nielsen & Johansson, 1980
 Cauchas brunnella Nielsen & Johansson, 1980
 Cauchas canalella (Eversmann, 1844)
 Cauchas cockerelli (Busck, 1915)
 Cauchas cyanella (Busck, 1915)
 Cauchas dietziella (Kearfott, 1908)
 Cauchas discalis Braun, 1925
 Cauchas fibulella (Denis & Schiffermüller, 1775)
 Cauchas florella (Staudinger, 1871)
 Cauchas leucocerella (Scopoli, 1763)
 Cauchas rufifrontella (Treitschke, 1833)
 Cauchas rufimitrella (Scopoli, 1763)
 Cauchas sedella (Busck, 1915)
 Cauchas simpliciella (Walsingham, 1880)
 Cauchas terskella Kuprijakov, 1994
 Cauchas tridesma (Meyrick, 1912)

References

External links

 Cauchas at funet

Adelidae
Adeloidea genera
Taxa named by Philipp Christoph Zeller